Marie Marchand-Arvier (born 8 April 1985) is a retired World Cup alpine ski racer from France.  Born in Laxou, she won a silver medal in the super-G at the 2009 World Championships. She finished fifth in the combined, and sixth in the downhill.

Marchand-Arvier competed at the 2006 Winter Olympics in Turin, where her best result was 15th in the downhill. At the 2010 Olympics in Vancouver, she finished 7th in the downhill and tenth in the combined at Whistler Creekside.

Marchand-Arvier married former biathlete Vincent Jay in June 2014. In March 2015 she announced her retirement from competition.

World cup results

Race podiums
5 podiums (4 downhill, 1 super-G)

Season standings

World Championship results

Olympic results

References

External links
 
 Marie Marchand-Arvier World Cup standings at the International Ski Federation
 

 

1985 births
French female alpine skiers
Alpine skiers at the 2006 Winter Olympics
Alpine skiers at the 2010 Winter Olympics
Alpine skiers at the 2014 Winter Olympics
Olympic alpine skiers of France
People from Laxou
Living people
Sportspeople from Meurthe-et-Moselle